Klaus-Michael Kühne (born 2 June 1937) is a German billionaire businessman. As of October 2021, the Bloomberg Billionaires Index estimated Kühne's net worth to be US$36.2 billion, making him the richest person in Germany. He is the honorary chairman and majority owner (53.3%) of the international transport company Kühne + Nagel, co-founded by his grandfather, August Kühne (1855–1932).

Career 
In 1963, he joined his father Alfred Kühne (1895–1981) as a junior partner at Kühne + Nagel. He has lived in Switzerland since 1975 in the city of Schindellegi, the location of the Kühne + Nagel headquarters. He became CEO of the company in 1996.

He also runs Kuhne Holding AG. In 2016, the company acquired 20% of VTG, a rail logistics company. In April 2020, Kühne upped his stake in shipping company Hapag-Lloyd to 30%, having previously owned 26% of the business, making him the largest shareholder.

In 2022, he doubled his stake in Deutsche Lufthansa AG, Germany's largest airline.

Honors 
The Kühne Logistics University in Hamburg is named after him.

See also
List of US-dollar billionaires in Germany
Kühne School of Logistics and Management

References

German billionaires
Businesspeople from Hamburg
German expatriates in Switzerland
Living people
1937 births
German businesspeople in transport
20th-century German businesspeople
21st-century German businesspeople